Zen Ties is a 2008 children's picture book by Jon J. Muth.  The book is a follow-up to Zen Shorts (2005), and a third book, Zen Ghosts, was released in September 2010.

Plot
Stillwater, a panda, and his three-human friends, Karl, Addy and Michael are back in a new adventure.  This time, Michael is faced with the daunting challenge of an upcoming spelling bee.  The story also introduces Miss Whitaker, an elderly neighbor whose cantankerous nature frightens the children.  Stillwater uses his quiet wisdom and insight to see past her bad temper to the lonely woman within.  Stillwater also receives a visit from his young nephew Koo, who speaks in Haiku.

American picture books
2008 children's books
Fictional pandas
Books about bears